Kalamar (also Romanized as Kalmor) is a village in Khotbeh Sara Rural District, Kargan Rud District, Talesh County, Gilan Province, Iran. At the 2006 census, its population was 44, in 9 families.

References 

Populated places in Talesh County